The Basmane-Ödemiş Regional ( ) is a regional rail service operated by the Turkish State Railways. The trains run between Basmane Terminal in İzmir and the town of Ödemiş, 113km to the south-east.

History
Passenger service between İzmir and Ödemiş dates back to 1884, when the Oriental Railway Company (ORC) built the line. TCDD took over operations in 1935 and operated a train on the route. Service was increased in 1971. In 2006, trains would terminate at Gaziemir, rather than go into İzmir, because of construction, but in 2009 service continued into İzmir once again. In April 2020 the service was suspended due to ongoing COVID 19 pandemic (Including İzmir-Tire Regional) but the service has resumed in June 2021).

References

External links
TCDD Official Site
Regional timetable - tcdd.gov.tr

Izmir-Odemis
Named passenger trains of Turkey
Railway services introduced in 1884
1884 establishments in the Ottoman Empire
Transport in İzmir Province
İzmir
Gaziemir District
Torbalı District
Ödemiş District